Cryptosporella is a genus of fungi in the family Gnomoniaceae. The genus was first circumscribed by Pier Andrea Saccardo in 1877. The genus contains 19 species.

Species
 Cryptosporella alnicola
 Cryptosporella alni-rubrae
 Cryptosporella alni-sinuatae
 Cryptosporella alni-tenuifoliae
 Cryptosporella amistadensis
 Cryptosporella betulae
 Cryptosporella corylina
 Cryptosporella femoralis
 Cryptosporella hypodermia
 Cryptosporella jaklitschii
 Cryptosporella marylandica
 Cryptosporella multicontinentalis
 Cryptosporella pacifica
 Cryptosporella suffusa
 Cryptosporella tomentella
 Cryptosporella wehmeyeriana
 Cryptosporella umbrina

References

Gnomoniaceae
Sordariomycetes genera